Admiral Radhakrishnan Hari Kumar  (born 12 April 1962) is a serving flag officer in the Indian Navy. He is the 25th and current Chief of the Naval Staff (CNS). Previously, he served as the Flag Officer Commanding-in-Chief, Western Naval Command. In his prior appointments, he served as the Chief of Integrated Defence Staff, Chief of Personnel, Controller Personnel Services, the Flag Officer Commanding Western Fleet, Flag Officer Sea Training and the Chief of the Staff of the Western Naval Command. He was the Commandant of the Naval War College, Goa and served as a naval advisor to the government of Seychelles. He is an alumnus of National Defence Academy, the Naval War College, the Army War College, Mhow and the Royal College of Defence Studies.

Early life and education 
Kumar was born on 12 April 1962 in Thiruvananthapuram, to M. Radhakrishnan Nair and B. Vijayalakshmi. His father worked with the Fertilisers and Chemicals Travancore in the sales department. 

Kumar was educated at Sacred Hearts Convent School, Thanjavur, Carmel Convent School, Thiruvananthapuram, and at Mannam Memorial Residential High School, Thiruvananthapuram. He completed his pre-degree course at the Government Arts College, Thiruvananthapuram.

He joined the 61st course of the National Defence Academy (NDA) in January 1979 and was assigned to the Juliet squadron. He graduated from the NDA in December 1981. In 1996, he attended the Naval Staff Course at the United States Naval War College in Newport, Rhode Island. He attended the Army Higher Command Course at the Army War College, Mhow in 2004 and the Royal College of Defence Studies, London in 2009.

He holds a bachelor's degree from Jawaharlal Nehru University and a master's degree from King's College London. He holds an MPhil in Defence and Strategic Studies from the University of Mumbai. He also holds a postgraduate diploma in shipping management from the Narottam Morarjee Institute of Shipping in Mumbai.

Career 
Kumar was commissioned into the Indian Navy on 1 January 1983. He specialised in gunnery. He also served as executive officer (EXO) of Veer-class corvette .

He was awarded the Vishisht Seva Medal for his command of the Ranvir when the mid-life upgrade was completed in which the ship was retrofitted with the BrahMos supersonic cruise missiles.

His fleet appointments include Fleet Gunnery Officer and Fleet Operations Officer of the Western Fleet. His staff assignments include Command GO of the Western Naval Command, and naval advisor to the Government of Seychelles. He also served as the Training Commander of the gunnery school INS Dronacharya. During the second phase of the UN intervention in Somalia, from December 1992 to June 1993, he served in the Civil and Military Operations Centre in Mogadishu.

Flag rank
On promotion to flag rank, Kumar was appointed the first Commandant of the Naval War College, Goa in January 2012. After a two-year stint, he was appointed Flag Officer Sea Training (FOST) and was responsible for the operational sea training of all personnel of Naval and Coast Guard ships and submarines. On 1 October 2014, he took command of the Western Fleet. While serving as the Flag Officer Commanding Western Fleet (FOCWF), he was promoted to the rank of Vice Admiral.

In October 2015, he relinquished command of the Western Fleet, handing over to Rear Admiral Ravneet Singh. For his command of the fleet, he was awarded the Ati Vishisht Seva Medal on 26 January 2016. He was then appointed Chief of the Staff of the Western Naval Command in Mumbai. He subsequently moved to Naval HQ as the Controller, Personnel Services (CPS). On 1 August 2018, he assumed charge as the Chief of Personnel (COP), succeeding Vice Admiral Anil Kumar Chawla. Get help with editing

After an 18-month tenure as COP, Kumar was promoted to Commander-in-Chief (C-in-C) grade and appointed Chief of Integrated Defence Staff (CISC). During his tenure as CISC, the Department of Military Affairs was created by the Government of India and the appointment of Chief of Defence Staff was created. For his tenure as CISC, he was awarded the Param Vishisht Seva Medal on 26 January 2021. On 28 February 2021, he was appointed Flag Officer Commanding-in-Chief Western Naval Command, taking over from Vice Admiral Ajit Kumar P.

Chief of Naval Staff
On 9 November 2021, the Government of India appointed Kumar as the next Chief of Naval Staff. He took office after superannuation of Admiral Karambir Singh on 30 November 2021.

Personal life
Kumar is married to Kala Nair, with whom he has a daughter. He enjoys swimming, playing badminton, and walking.

Awards and decorations
During his career, he has been awarded the Vishisht Seva Medal (VSM) in 2010, the Ati Vishisht Seva Medal (AVSM) in 2016 and the Param Vishisht Seva Medal (PVSM) in 2021 for his service.

Gallery

References

1962 births
Living people
Indian Navy admirals
Chiefs of the Naval Staff (India)
Chiefs of Personnel (India)
Commandants of Naval War College, Goa
Flag Officers Commanding Western Fleet
Flag Officers Sea Training
Indian naval attachés
National Defence Academy (India) alumni
Naval War College alumni
Army War College, Mhow alumni
Graduates of the Royal College of Defence Studies
Alumni of King's College London
University of Mumbai alumni
Recipients of the Ati Vishisht Seva Medal
Recipients of the Vishisht Seva Medal
Jawaharlal Nehru University alumni
Military personnel from Thiruvananthapuram
Recipients of the Param Vishisht Seva Medal